Stuart Park was an electoral division of the Legislative Assembly in Australia's Northern Territory. One of the Legislative Assembly's original electorates, it was first contested at the 1974 election, and was abolished in 1983. It was named after the Darwin suburb of Stuart Park.

Members for Stuart Park

Election results

Elections in the 1970s

 The number of votes each individual Independent received is unknown.
 The independent candidate that came second on preferences is unknown.

Elections in the 1980s

 Preferences were not distributed.

References

Former electoral divisions of the Northern Territory